Hacıoğlu is a Turkish surname. Notable people with the surname include:

 Mehmet Hacıoğlu (born 1959), Turkish footballer and manager
 Murat Hacıoğlu (born 1979), Turkish footballer
 İsmail Hacıoğlu (born 1985), Turkish actor. He is also the son of former footballer Mehmet Hacıoğlu

Turkish-language surnames